On November 4, 1980, the District of Columbia held an election for its non-voting House delegate representing the District of Columbia's at-large congressional district. The winner of the race was Walter E. Fauntroy (D), who won his fifth re-election. All elected members would serve in 97th United States Congress.

The delegate is elected for two-year terms.

Candidates 
Walter E. Fauntroy, a Democrat, sought re-election for his sixth term to the United States House of Representatives. Fauntroy was opposed in this election by Republican challenger Robert J. Roehr and D.C. Statehood Party candidate Josephine D. Butler who received 14.02% and 9.55%, respectively.  This resulted in Fauntroy being elected with 74.44% of the vote.

Results

See also
 United States House of Representatives elections in the District of Columbia

References 

United States House
District of Columbia
1980